Mister Elias De'Angelo "Whop" Philyor (born July 31, 1998) is an American football wide receiver for the Michigan Panthers of the United States Football League (USFL). He played college football for the Indiana Hoosiers.

Early life and high school
Philyor grew up in Tampa, Florida and attended Henry B. Plant High School. As a senior, he caught 91 passes for 1,329 yards and 20 touchdowns.

College career
Philyor had 23 receptions for 235 yards and one touchdown in seven total games in his sophomore season, which was cut short due to injury. He was named second-team All-Big Ten Conference as a junior after catching 70 passes for 1,002 yards and five touchdowns. Philyor considered entering the 2020 NFL Draft after the season, but ultimately opted to return to Indiana for his senior year. He was named to the Fred Biletnikoff Award watchlist going into his senior season. Philyor finished the season with 54 catches for 495 yards and three touchdowns and was named honorable mention All-Big Ten.

Professional career

Minnesota Vikings
Philyor signed with the Minnesota Vikings as an undrafted free agent on May 5, 2021. He was waived on August 31, 2021 and re-signed to the practice squad the next day. He was released on October 4, 2021.

Michigan Panthers
On September 26, 2022, Philyor signed with the Michigan Panthers of the United States Football League (USFL).

References

External links
Indiana Hoosiers bio

1998 births
Living people
Players of American football from Tampa, Florida
American football wide receivers
Indiana Hoosiers football players
Minnesota Vikings players
Michigan Panthers (2022) players